Karl Artur Leonid Kubbel (1891 or 1892 – 1942) was a Russian composer of chess endgame studies and problems.

Life 
Kubbel was born in Saint Petersburg at the end of 1891, or beginning of 1892 and died in the same city (then called Leningrad) on 18 April 1942. He was christened Karl Artur Leonid, but dropped the first two names around the time of the 1917 Russian Revolution.

He composed more than 1500 endgame studies and chess problems, many of which were awarded first prize for their great beauty and original conception. He is generally considered one of the greatest of all endgame composers. He was a chemical engineer by profession.

Leonid's brothers, Arvid and Evgeny, were also chess players. Arvid Kubbel was a strong over-the-board master, having played in the first four USSR chess championships, while Evgeny was himself an endgame composer.
Both Leonid and Evgeny Kubbel died of starvation in 1942 during the Nazi siege of Leningrad, while Arvid was executed by the NKVD in 1938.

A study by Leonid Kubbel 
This is one of Leonid Kubbel's many masterpieces. The Black a-pawn apparently cannot be stopped from promotion, after which the game would be lost for White; however, a subtle plan avoids defeat and checkmates the black king. Video analysis of this study can be found .

Solution:
 1. Nc6!! (threatens Nb4+, blocking the a-pawn) Kxc6
 2. Bf6 Kd5
 3. d3 a2
 4. c4+ Kc5(4....dxc3 5.Bxc3 is a simple technical win)
 5. Kb7! a1=Q (if 5...Kd6 or 5... Kb4 then 6.Bxd4 stopping the pawn)
 6. Be7 checkmate.

Works on Leonid Kubbel 
 25 ausgewählte Endspielstudien von Leonid Kubbel (German), Jan van Reek, 1996.
 Leonid Kubbel’s Chess Endgame Studies, TG Whitworth, 2004.
 Леонид Куббель (Russian), J. Vladimirowitsch and Y.Fokin, 1984.

External links 
 Biographical data on chess composers
 Magazine survey of endgame studies

References 

- Preface by Grigory Levenfish in: "K.A.L. Kubbel Schachmatnich etjudov: 150 Endgame Studies", Leningrad, 1925 (Russian).

1890s births
1942 deaths
Baltic-German people
Russian chess players
Soviet chess players
Chess composers
Sportspeople from Saint Petersburg
Deaths by starvation
20th-century chess players
Victims of the Siege of Leningrad